W. H. Freeman and Company is an imprint of Macmillan Higher Education, a division of Macmillan Publishers. Macmillan publishes monographs and textbooks for the sciences under the imprint.

History
The company was founded in 1946 by William H. Freeman, who had been a salesman and editor at Macmillan Publishing. Freeman's first published book was General Chemistry, by Linus Pauling. Freeman was acquired by Scientific American Inc. in 1964. Holtzbrinck Publishing Group bought Scientific American in 1986.

Works
Titles published by W. H. Freeman include James Watson’s Recombinant DNA (1983), William J. Kaufmann III's The Universe (1985), Jon Rogawski’s Calculus (2007), and Peter Atkins’ Physical Chemistry (2014).

References

External links

Official W. H. Freeman and Company website (archived)

Book publishing companies of the United States
Publishing companies established in 1946
1946 establishments in the United States
Holtzbrinck Publishing Group
1964 mergers and acquisitions